Joseph Buonomo (born November 28, 1943) is an American entrepreneur and a co-founder of Direct Computer Resources, an enterprise software company.

Overview 
Buonomo has served as DCR's President and CEO since 2000. Prior to that, he was DCR’s Executive Vice President beginning with the company’s inception in 1996. Buonomo was one of the four original developers of the company’s first product, DataVantage for IMS. Under Buonomo’s leadership, DCR has since developed several data-security software products.

He is a member of the board of directors of the Internet Security Alliance and has been active in seeking solutions to issues of cybersecurity.

References

External links 
 Direct Computer Resources, Inc., website

Businesspeople in software
American technology chief executives
American computer businesspeople
Living people
1943 births